Akroyd is an English surname.  Notable people with the surname include:

 Annette Beveridge (née Akroyd; 1842–1929), British Orientalist
 Bayly Akroyd (1850–1926), English cricketer
 Edward Akroyd (1810–1887), English manufacturer
 Joe Akroyd, English loudspeaker manufacturer
 Swainson Akroyd (1848–1925), English cricketer

See also 
 Aykroyd
 Ackroyd
 Hornsby-Akroyd oil engine

References 

English-language surnames